Martinizing Dry Cleaning is a  dry cleaning franchise founded in 1949. Martin Franchises, Inc., the parent company, is the largest dry cleaning franchise in the United States, with over 450 franchised stores worldwide. The company is based in Berkley, Michigan.  

The concept of One Hour Martinizing was pioneered by a New York chemist named Henry Martin in 1949. At the time, dry cleaning was done with flammable solvents, so the plants were located remotely from the storefronts. A customer would drop off cleaning "in town", the garments would travel to the production facility to be cleaned and pressed, then they would return to the store several days later for pickup. By using a non-flammable solvent, the use of which was discovered by Martin, dry cleaning plants could now be located much more conveniently, and the process could be carried out in a much more timely manner. The use of this non-flammable solvent was adopted throughout the industry and revolutionized the business in that facilities could better serve their customers and provide much faster turn-around on the orders, if need be. Operationally this has been termed "on-site cleaning" (as opposed to the "remote" cleaning of the past).

History 
The company was originally known as One Hour Martinizing, because customers could get their garments in as little time as an hour. Martin Equipment Company was founded to produce  special equipment to clean  garments. Later, Martin Equipment Company became part of American Laundry Machinery in Ohio. The number of Martinizing franchises grew quite large during the 1950s and the 1960s. At that time, there was a flat annual fee that the franchisee would pay. A Martinizing franchisee had to have a certain brand of equipment, and had to follow certain procedures. Phrases such as "Fresh as a Flower in Just one Hour" and "the Most in Drycleaning" were part of the trademarks. In the 1950s and 1960s, two colors, red and green, were part of the OHM scheme. The concept was that by having consistent equipment at each franchisee along with the use of similar methods, the result would be consistency as is seen today with the various food franchisees. 

The Huntington Company of Berkley, Michigan, acquired Martinizing on November 7, 2014.

Company trends 
According to Entrepreneur.com, the company has been steadily losing franchises.

References

External links 
 
  Company History (archived)

American companies established in 1949
Retail companies established in 1949
2014 mergers and acquisitions
Franchises
1949 establishments in Ohio